A terrapin is a turtle living in fresh or brackish water.

Terrapin may also refer to:

 Terrapin (amphibious vehicle), a World War II transport vehicle used by the Allies
 HMS Terrapin (P323), a World War II British submarine
 "Terrapin" (song), a 1970 song by Syd Barrett
 "The Terrapin", a short story by Patricia Highsmith
 Terrapin Beer Company, a brewery in Athens, Georgia, US
 Maryland Terrapins, the athletic teams of the University of Maryland
 Portable classroom or terrapin, a temporary school building

See also
 Terrapin Station, a 1977 album by Grateful Dead
 Terrapene, the Latin name for the box turtle genus (which does not include terrapins)